The Montenegrin First League playoffs is a two legs tournament between the teams from Montenegrin First League just above direct relegation, and the teams from Montenegrin Second League just below direct promotion.

Format
At the end of each season, 8th and 9th placed teams from the Montenegrin First League play against the 2nd and 3rd placed teams from the Montenegrin Second League. The winners play the next season in the First League, while losers are members of next edition of the Second League.

In every playoffs, matches are played over two legs - the 8th placed team from First League against the 3rd placed team from Second League, and the 9th placed team from First League against the 2nd placed team from Second League.

Before the season 2017-18, when the number of First League members was reduced to 10, the playoffs included the 10th and 11th placed teams from the First League.

Participants

Participants by season
Below is the list of playoffs participants by every single season. The playoffs from 2006 are excluded, because the participants were teams from the Serbo-Montenegrin Second League and the Montenegrin Republic League.

Teams

Results

2006
In the 2006 playoffs, FK Zora from Serbo-Montenegrin Second League played OFK Titograd from Montenegrin Republic League. Winner gained promotion to the inaugural season of the Montenegrin First League.

OFK Titograd gained promotion to the 2006–07 Montenegrin First League, while Zora was relegated to the 2006–07 Montenegrin Second League.

2007
In 2007 playoffs, FK Dečić and FK Jedinstvo from the Montenegrin First League competed against FK Bokelj and FK Ibar from the Montenegrin Second League.

Dečić remained a member of the First League, while Bokelj gained promotion to the 2007–08 Montenegrin First League. Ibar remained a member of the Second League, while Jedinstvo relegated to the 2007–08 Montenegrin Second League.

2008
In 2008 playoffs participated FK Sutjeska and FK Bokelj from Montenegrin First League against FK Jedinstvo and FK Čelik from Montenegrin Second League.

Sutjeska remained a member of First League, while Jedinstvo gained promotion to 2008–09 Montenegrin First League. Čelik remained a member of Second League, while Bokelj relegated to 2008–09 Montenegrin Second League.

2009
In 2009 playoffs participated FK Jezero and FK Dečić from Montenegrin First League against OFK Titograd and FK Mornar from Montenegrin Second League.

Dečić remained a member of First League, while Mornar gained promotion to 2009–10 Montenegrin First League. OFK Titograd remained a member of Second League, while Jezero relegated to 2009–10 Montenegrin Second League.

2010
In 2010 playoffs FK Mornar and FK Berane from the Montenegrin First League competed against OFK Bar and FK Bratstvo from the Montenegrin Second League.

Mornar remained a member of the First League, while OFK Bar gained promotion to the 2010–11 Montenegrin First League. Bratstvo remained a member of the Second League, while Berane was relegated to the 2010–11 Montenegrin Second League.

2011
In 2011 playoffs FK Mornar and Sutjeska from the Montenegrin First League competed against FK Berane and Jedinstvo from the Montenegrin Second League.

Sutjeska remained a member of the First League, while Berane gained promotion to the 2011–12 Montenegrin First League. Jedinstvo remained a member of the Second League, while Mornar relegated to the 2011–12 Montenegrin Second League.

2012
In 2012 playoffs participated FK Dečić and FK Berane from Montenegrin First League against FK Mornar and Jedinstvo from Montenegrin Second League.

Mornar and Jedinstvo gained promotion to the 2012–13 Montenegrin First League. Dečić and Berane were relegated to the 2012–13 Montenegrin Second League.

2013
In 2013 playoffs FK Mogren and FK Mornar from the Montenegrin First League competed against FK Bokelj and FK Zabjelo from the Montenegrin Second League.

Mogren and Mornar remained a members of the First League. Bokelj and Zabjelo remained a members of the Second League.

2014
In 2014 playoffs participated FK Mogren and FK Mornar from the Montenegrin First League against FK Berane and FK Jezero from the Montenegrin Second League.

Mogren remained a member of the First League, while Berane gained promotion to the 2014–15 Montenegrin First League. Jezero remained a member of the Second League, while Mornar was relegated to the 2014–15 Montenegrin Second League. As FK Čelik withdrew from the 2014–15 Montenegrin First League before the start of season, FK Mornar gained a wild-card to play in the First League.

2015
In 2015 playoffs FK Mogren and FK Mornar from the Montenegrin First League competed against FK Dečić and OFK Igalo from the Montenegrin Second League.

Mornar remained a member of the First League, while Dečić gained promotion to the 2015–16 Montenegrin First League. OFK Igalo remained a member of the Second League, while Mogren was relegated to the 2015–16 Montenegrin Second League.

2016
In 2016 playoffs OFK Petrovac and FK Iskra from the Montenegrin First League against FK Cetinje and FK Bratstvo from the Montenegrin Second League.

OFK Petrovac and Iskra remained a members of the First League. Cetinje and Bratstvo remained a members of the Second League.

2017
In 2017 playoffs OFK Petrovac and FK Rudar from the Montenegrin First League against FK Ibar and FK Otrant from the Montenegrin Second League.

OFK Petrovac and Rudar remained a members of the First League. Otrant and Ibar remained a members of the Second League.

2018
In 2018 playoffs FK Kom and OFK Petrovac from Montenegrin First League against FK Podgorica and FK Lovćen from Montenegrin Second League.

OFK Petrovac remained a member of the First League, while Lovćen gained promotion to the 2018–19 Montenegrin First League. Podgorica remained a member of the Second League, while Kom relegated to the 2018–19 Montenegrin Second League.

2019
In 2019 playoffs FK Rudar and FK Lovćen from the Montenegrin First League competed against FK Kom and FK Bokelj from the Montenegrin Second League.

Rudar remained a member of the First League, while Kom gained promotion to the 2019–20 Montenegrin First League. Bokelj remained a member of the Second League, while Lovćen relegated to the 2019–20 Montenegrin Second League.

2020
In 2020 playoffs OFK Titograd and FK Kom from Montenegrin First League competed against FK Jezero and FK Bokelj from the Montenegrin Second League. All the games were played without fans, due to the COVID-19 pandemic.

Titograd remained a member of the First League, while Jezero gained promotion to the 2020–21 Montenegrin First League. Bokelj remained a member of the Second League, while Kom relegated to the 2020–21 Montenegrin Second League.

2021
In 2021 playoffs OFK Petrovac and FK Iskra from the Montenegrin First League competed against FK Arsenal and FK Igalo from the Montenegrin Second League.

OFK Petrovac and Iskra remained a members of First League. Arsenal and Igalo remained a members of Second League.

2022
In 2022 playoffs FK Podgorica and FK Rudar from the Montenegrin First League competed against OFK Mladost DG and FK Arsenal from the Montenegrin Second League.

Rudar remained a member of the First League, while Arsenal gained promotion to the 2022–23 Montenegrin First League. Mladost DG remained a member of the Second League, while Podgorica relegated to the 2022–23 Montenegrin Second League.

External links
 

Montenegrin First League
Montenegrin Second League